Yasmeen Tori Fletcher is an American actress and musician. She is best known for her role as Nakia Bahadir in the Disney+ series Ms. Marvel (2022).

Early life
Fletcher was born in Orange County, California to parents Troy, a pool contractor and Maysoun, a defense attorney. She is of Lebanese descent on her mother's side. From the age of three, she grew up in Las Vegas, Nevada with her younger sister. After commuting between Las Vegas and California for a number of years, the family officially relocated to La Crescenta at the end of 2018.

Career
Fletcher made her debut in 2019 with roles in the film Ham on Rye and as Kaitlin, Buffy's (Sofia Wylie) basketball teammate in season 3 of the Disney Channel comedy-drama Andi Mack. Fletcher then played Chandra in the Disney Channel Original Movie Upside-Down Magic, an adaptation of the Scholastic book series of the same name, and Carly in the family sci-fi Let Us In.

In December 2020, it was revealed Fletcher had joined the main cast of the 2022 Disney+ Marvel series Ms. Marvel as Nakia Bahadir, a school friend of the titular character, also known as Kamala Khan (Iman Vellani).

Filmography

Music videos

References

External links
 

Living people
21st-century American actresses
Actresses from California
Actresses from Las Vegas
American film actresses
American people of Lebanese descent
American television actresses
American women musicians
People from Orange County, California
Year of birth missing (living people)